Turvayana was a young Paktha king who is referred to in the ancient Hindu Rig Veda text.

See also
Chyavana
Battle of the Ten Kings

References

Pashtun people
Ancient history of Pakistan
Ancient history of Afghanistan